The discography of N.W.A, an American hip hop group, consists of two studio albums, six compilation albums, one extended play (EP), eight singles, one video album and five music videos. N.W.A was formed in Compton, California in 1986 by Eazy-E, Dr. Dre, DJ Yella, Arabian Prince and Ice Cube, with The D.O.C. and MC Ren joining later. The group's first release was the compilation album N.W.A. and the Posse in 1987, which also featured songs by The Fila Fresh Crew, Rappinstine and Ron-De-Vu. Their debut album Straight Outta Compton followed the next year, which initially reached number 37 on the US Billboard 200; it has since reached number four, and has sold over 1.5 million copies in the US alone. "Straight Outta Compton", "Gangsta Gangsta" and "Express Yourself" were released as singles from the album, all of which registered on the Billboard Hot R&B/Hip-Hop Songs chart.

Arabian Prince left N.W.A due to having many royalty and financial disagreements with N.W.A's manager and Eazy-E's business partner Jerry Heller's whilst Ice Cube left N.W.A in 1989 due to ongoing financial disagreements. The remaining members released the EP 100 Miles and Runnin' in 1990, which reached the top ten of the Billboard Top R&B/Hip-Hop Albums chart and has since been certified platinum by the RIAA. N.W.A's second and final album followed in 1991: Niggaz4Life, commonly referred to backwards as Efil4Zaggin, The album's singles were "Appetite for Destruction" and "Alwayz into Somethin'", neither of which charted in the US. Niggaz4Life: The Only Home Video was released in 1992, featuring three music videos and previously unreleased footage. Dr. Dre left N.W.A the same year, at which point the group had essentially disbanded and Eazy-E died in 1995 after being diagnosed with HIV. Since the group's breakup a number of compilation albums have been released, including 1996's Greatest Hits which reached the top 50 of the Billboard 200.

Albums

Studio albums

Compilation albums

Extended plays

Singles

Other charted songs

Videos

Video albums

Music videos

See also
List of songs recorded by N.W.A

References

External links
N.W.A at AllMusic
N.W.A discography at Discogs
N.W.A discography at MusicBrainz

Discographies of American artists
Hip hop discographies
Discography